Carex haematostoma, also known as hong zui tai cao in China, is a tussock-forming species of perennial sedge in the family Cyperaceae. It is native to parts of central Asia and China.

Description
The inflorescence is composed of four to eight spike of which two to four are male.

Taxonomy
The species was described by the botanist Christian Gottfried Daniel Nees von Esenbeck in 1834 as a part of the work Contributions to the Botany of India written by Robert Wight. The type specimen was collected in India by Duthie et al.

Distribution
The plant is native to the temperate region of Central Asia with a range extending from Kazakhstan in the north west through Uzbekistan, Tajikistan and Kyrgyzstan to Afghanistan and Pakistan in the south west. The range extends east through the Himalayas including Nepal and Tibet and into southern and central parts of China.

See also
List of Carex species

References

haematostoma
Plants described in 1834
Taxa named by Christian Gottfried Daniel Nees von Esenbeck
Flora of Pakistan
Flora of China
Flora of Afghanistan
Flora of Kazakhstan
Flora of Kyrgyzstan
Flora of Nepal
Flora of Tajikistan
Flora of Uzbekistan
Flora of Tibet